William Russell Watrous III (June 8, 1939 – July 2, 2018) was an American jazz trombonist. He is perhaps best known for his rendition of Sammy Nestico's arrangement of the Johnny Mandel ballad "A Time for Love", which he recorded on a 1993 album of the same name.  A self-described "bop-oriented" player, he was well known among trombonists as a master technician and for his mellifluous sound.

Biography 

He was born in Middletown, Connecticut, United States. Watrous' father, also a trombonist, introduced him to the instrument at an early age. While serving in the U.S. Navy, Watrous studied with jazz pianist and composer Herbie Nichols. His first professional performances were in Billy Butterfield's band.

Watrous' career blossomed in the 1960s. He played and recorded with many prominent jazz musicians, including Count Basie, Maynard Ferguson, Woody Herman, Quincy Jones, Johnny Richards, and trombonist Kai Winding. He also played with well-known vocalists Frank Sinatra, Ray Charles, Ella Fitzgerald, and Sarah Vaughn. He played in the house band on the Merv Griffin Show from 1965 to 1968. From 1967 to 1969, he worked as a staff musician for CBS. 

In 1971, he played with the jazz fusion group Ten Wheel Drive. Also in the 1970s, Watrous formed his own band, The Manhattan Wildlife Refuge Big Band, which recorded two albums for Columbia Records. The band was later renamed Refuge West when Watrous moved to southern California.

He continued to work as a bandleader, studio musician, and performer at jazz clubs. In 1983, Watrous collaborated with Alan Raph to publish Trombonisms, an instructional manual covering performance techniques for trombone. He has recorded as a solo artist, bandleader, and in small ensembles. These recordings include a Japanese import album in 2001 containing material recorded in 1984 with Carl Fontana, whom Watrous has cited as his favorite trombonist. He traveled periodically to San Diego to play with his good friend and former student, Dave Scott, a noted jazz musician himself and TV broadcast host. The SHSU Bill Watrous Jazz Festival which is held annually at Sam Houston State University in Huntsville, Texas is named in his honor and claims to be the oldest jazz festival in Texas.

Watrous taught for two decades at the University of Southern California in Los Angeles, before retiring in 2015. He died in Los Angeles on July 2, 2018. He was survived by his wife, Maryann; their son, Jason; and two daughters from a previous marriage – Melody Watrous Ide and Cheryl Schoolcraft.

Other Talents 
Bill Watrous played baseball. He was scouted by the New York Yankees when in his teens. Later on, Watrous considered joining a minor league baseball team in the early 80's.

Awards and nominations 
1975, Grammy Nomination for The Tiger of San Pedro

2019 The Legacy Circle Award of The International Trombone Association

2 Down Beat Awards and nominated top trombonist by Down beat for 7 years in a row.

Discography

As leader
 In Love Again (as William Russell Watrous with the Richard Behrke Strings) (MTA, 1964)
 Plays Love Themes for the Underground, the Establishment & Other Sub Cultures Not Yet Known (With the Walter Raim Concept) (MTA, 1969)
  Bone Straight Ahead (Famous Door, 1973)
 Manhattan Wildlife Refuge (Columbia, 1974)
 The Tiger of San Pedro (Columbia, 1975)
 Funk 'n' Fun (Yupiteru, 1979)
 Watrous in Hollywood (Famous Door, 1979)
 Coronary Trombossa! (Famous Door, 1980)
 I'll Play for You (Famous Door, 1980)
 La Zorra (Famous Door, 1980)
 Bill Watrous in London (Mole Jazz, 1982)
 Roaring Back to New York, New York (Famous Door, 1983)
 Bill Watrous and Carl Fontana (Atlas, 1984)
 Someplace Else (Soundwings, 1986)
 Reflections (Soundwings, 1987)
 Bone-Ified (GNP Crescendo, 1992)
 Time for Love (GNP Crescendo, 1993)
 Space Available (Double-Time, 1997)
 Live at the Blue Note (Half Note, 2000)
 Living in the Moment with The Gary Urwin Jazz Orchestra (Sea Breeze, 2003)
 Live in Living Comfort (Stonequake, 2003)
 Mad to the Bone with The Rob Stoneback Big Band (Stonequake, 2003)
 Kindred Spirits with The Gary Urwin Jazz Orchestra (Summit, 2006)

As sideman
With Deodato
Prelude (CTI, 1973)
With Kenny Burrell
Blues - The Common Ground (Verve, 1968)
With Paul Desmond
Summertime (A&M/CTI, 1968)
With Maynard Ferguson
The Blues Roar (Mainstream, 1965)
With Quincy Jones
 Golden Boy (Mercury, 1964)
 Roots (A&M, 1977)
With O'Donel Levy
Dawn of a New Day (Groove Merchant, 1973)
Simba (Groove Merchant, 1974)
With Milton Nascimento
Courage (A&M/CTI, 1969)
With Jimmy Witherspoon
Blues for Easy Livers (Prestige, 1965)
With Johnny Richards

 Aqui Se Habla Español (Roulette, 1967)

With Red Rodney
The Red Tornado (Muse, 1975)
With Arturo Sandoval
Dream Come True (1993)
With Kai Winding
Modern Country (Verve, 1964)
The In Instrumentals (Verve, 1965)
More Brass (Verve, 1966)
Dirty Dog (Verve, 1966)
Penny Lane & Time (Verve, 1967)
Trombone Summit (MPS,1980)
With Pennsbury Concert Jazz Band
Then & Now (2013)
'With Ingrid James and San Gabriel 7 (JGS-SG7, 2012)

References

External links

1939 births
2018 deaths
American jazz trombonists
Male trombonists
Bebop trombonists
Bebop bandleaders
Musicians from Los Angeles
People from Middletown, Connecticut
Military personnel from Connecticut
Jazz musicians from California
Jazz musicians from Connecticut
American male jazz musicians
Double-Time Records artists
Summit Records artists
Columbia Records artists